The M'zab or Mzab (Mozabite: Aghlan) is a natural region of the northern Sahara Desert in Ghardaïa Province, Algeria.

Geology 

The Mzab is a limestone plateau,  centred on the Wad Mzab (Oued Mzab) valley.

History 
The Mozabites ("Ath Mzab") are a branch of a large Berber tribe, the Iznaten, which lived in large areas of middle southern Algeria. Many Tifinagh letters and symbols are engraved around the Mzab Valley.

After the Muslim conquest of the Maghreb, the Mozabites became Muslims of the Mu'tazili school. The indigenous Christian population persisted until the 11th century. After the fall of the Rustamid state, the Rustamid royal family with some of their citizens chose the Mzab Valley as their refuge. However, the Rostemids were Ibadi and sent a preacher (Abu Bakr an-Nafusi) who successfully converted the indigenous Mozabites.

France invaded Algeria in 1830. The M'zab was annexed to France only in 1882 and reverted to Algerian indigenous rule in summer 1962 upon its national independence. Ghardaia (Taghardait) is the main town and capital of the M'zab, while El Atteuf (Tajnint) is the oldest settlement in the region. Beni Isguen (At Isgen) is the most sacred Berber Islamic town. It prohibits all non-M'zabites from various sections of this town and all foreigners from spending the night within its walls. Melika (At Mlichet) is populated by a kabily town named Mlikch which is until now located near Bouira, and it contains spacious cemeteries and a historical Mosque in the center of the ksar, while Bounoura (At Bounour) is a historical ksar which contain Azwil palm grove, while El Guerrara (Igraren) and Berriane (Iberguen) have been part of the M'zab since the 17th century.

Architecture 

There are five qsur "walled villages" (ksour) located on rocky outcrops along the Wəd Mzab collectively known as the Pentapolis, founded between 1012 and 1350. They are: Ghardaïa (Tagherdayt), the principal settlement today; Beni Isguen (At Isjen) (Arabic: بني يزقن); Melika (At Mlishet); Bounoura (At Bunur); and El Atteuf (Tajnint), the oldest of the five settlements. Adding the more recent settlements of Bérianne and El Guerrara, the Mzab Heptapolis is completed.

The combination of the functional purism of the Ibāḍī faith with the way of life necessary near an oasis has led to a strict organization of land and space. Each citadel has a fortress-like mosque, whose minaret served as a watchtower. Houses of standard size and type were constructed in concentric circles around the mosque. The architecture of the M'zab settlements was designed for egalitarian communal living, with respect for family privacy. The M'zab building style is of Libyan-Phoenician type, more specifically of Berber style and has been replicated in other parts of the Sahara.

In the summer, the Mzabites migrated to 'summer citadels' centred on palm grove oases. This is one of the major oasis groups of the Sahara Desert, and is bounded by arid country known as chebka, crossed by dry river beds.

The M'zab Valley was listed as a UNESCO World Heritage Site in 1982, as an intact example of traditional human habitat perfectly adapted to the environment.

Society 
The insular nature of the Ibāḍiyya has preserved the area, and Ibāḍī  Σezzaba continue to dominate the social life of the area. A federal council, Majlis Ammi Said, unites representatives of the seven settlements as well as Ouargla, an ancient town located 200 km South-East of the Mzab valley. This council forms a federative body for religious, social and, increasingly, cultural matters. This religious federal council represents an “Islamic type of government” unique today.

Numerous details of Ibāḍiyya social life are ruled by this Islamic government, such as the weight of gold given as a dowry to a woman (maximum 60 grams) to the length of wedding celebrations (three days). The council makes decisions on details such as dowries, celebrations, dress. It used to impose punishments including exile, and a form of tabriyya "quarantine", where the offender may not interact with his fellow citizens. However, with economic, social and political integration to Algeria, these sanctions are less effective, and tend to have more impact on women.

The local language of the Mzab is Mozabite (Tumẓabt), a branch of the Zenati group of Berber languages.

Ghardaya is also one of the four large military and administrative territories into which southern Algeria is divided.

Demographics 
The Mzabis are Ibadis.

Notable people 
 Moufdi Zakaria, Algerian poet, author of the National Anthem

See also 
 Maghreb
 Sahara
 Desert

References

External links 
 UNESCO Advisory Body Evaluation
 The changing world of Mzab
 Mzab Net The Mozabit Network

Geography of Algeria
Berber history
M'zab Valley
Geography of Ghardaïa Province